The Uzhavan Express is a train route of the Southern Railway zone of the Indian Railways and runs between Chennai Egmore and Thanjavur Junction. The express was introduced on 1 September 2013. It operates daily and covers a distance of 351 km.

Schedule

Rolling Stock
Uzhavan Express runs end to end with WAP-4 Loco From Arakkonam, Erode Electric Shed, WAP-7 from Royapuram Electric Loco Shed.

Coach Composition
 1 AC I Tier
 2 AC II Tier
 3 AC III Tiers
 12 Sleeper Coaches
 3 General
 2 Second-class Luggage/parcel van

The Uzhavan Express between Chennai Egmore and Thanjavur has a rake sharing agreement (RSA) with Ananthapuri Express between Chennai and Kollam. The primary maintenance of four rakes of the express trains is being carried out at the Trichy coaching depot.

References

Transport in Chennai
Named passenger trains of India
Rail transport in Tamil Nadu
2013 establishments in Tamil Nadu
Express trains in India